Brandon Doughty (born October 6, 1991) is a former American football quarterback. He played college football at Western Kentucky and was their starting quarterback from 2013 to 2015.

Early years
Doughty attended North Broward Preparatory School in Coconut Creek, Florida.  During his career as the starting quarterback he passed for 2,885 yards with 23 touchdowns and 12 interceptions.  Rated as a three-star recruit by both ESPN and Rivals.com, Doughty was named an FACA North-South All-Star, a Dade-Broward All-Star and was named to the First-team All-Broward County by the Miami Herald and the Sun-Sentinel.

Originally, Doughty had committed to Florida Atlantic before signing with WKU for the 2010 recruiting class.

College career

2010
Doughty redshirted the 2010 season.

2011

Doughty made his college football debut for the Hilltoppers in a 40–14 loss to Navy.  Making a relief appearance, Doughty completed 12 of 21 passes for 102 yards, no touchdowns and an interception.  Still, his performance was enough to earn him the starting job the next week at home against Indiana State. However, after only three plays (and one completion for four yards), Doughty suffered a knee injury which ended his freshman season.

2012

As a redshirt sophomore, Doughty saw limited action as a relief quarterback, appearing in two games against Austin Peay and Southern Miss.  In these games, Doughty completed one of three pass attempts for seven yards.

2013

Regaining his starting job as a redshirt junior, Doughty set many records during the 2013 season.  Among the new records were single-season passing yards (2,857), single-season completion percentage (65.8), and single-game completions and passing yards (29 and 386, respectively, both in a 32–26 defeat on October 26 against Troy).  Overall, Doughty finished the 2013 season completing 246 of 374 attempts with 14 touchdowns and 14 interceptions.

2014

2014 was the Hilltoppers' first season as a member of Conference USA. Doughty broke his previous records for single-game completions and passing yards (46 and 569, respectively, in the season-opening 59–31 victory over Bowling Green).  Playing only one game with a completion percentage below 58.3 or a passer rating lower than 119.9 (that game being a 59–10 defeat on November 10 to Louisiana Tech), Doughty and WKU finished the regular season with a 7–5 overall record (4–4 in Conference USA).

On December 10, Doughty was named Conference USA's Most Valuable Player, the same day it was announced that the NCAA had granted him a sixth year of eligibility.

The next day, on December 11, Doughty was announced as the winner of the 2014 Sammy Baugh Trophy, becoming the first Hilltopper and only the third quarterback from Conference USA to do so.

On December 24, Doughty led the Hilltoppers to a 49–48 victory over Central Michigan in the 2014 Bahamas Bowl, completing 31 of 42 pass attempts for 486 yards, five touchdown passes and no interceptions en route to being named the Offensive MVP for the game.

Overall, for the season Doughty completed 375 of 552 passing attempts for an FBS-leading 4,830 yards (16th all-time in the FBS) and 49 touchdowns (a Conference USA football single-season record and tied for sixth all-time in the FBS) and only ten interceptions, picking up a quarterback rating of 167.1.

2015
Doughty completed 388 of 540 passes for 5,055 yards with 48 touchdowns. His 5,055 yards in the 2015 season broke his previous record for most yards in a single season. From the beginning of the 2014 season to the end of the 2015 season he threw for 97 touchdowns, more than any other quarterback in a two-year span in NCAA history. Doughty finished his career in the top 25 in NCAA history for career passing yards, passing touchdowns, and completion percentage. Doughty played in the 2016 East-West Shrine game prior to the 2016 NFL Draft.

College statistics

Professional career

Miami Dolphins
Doughty was drafted in the seventh round of the 2016 NFL Draft by the Miami Dolphins with the 223rd pick, acquired in a trade that sent Jamar Taylor to the Cleveland Browns. He was released by the Dolphins on September 14, 2016. He was signed to the team's practice squad on September 16. He signed a reserve/future contract with the Dolphins on January 10, 2017.

On September 2, 2017, Doughty was waived by the Dolphins and was signed to the practice squad the next day. He signed a reserve/future contract with the Dolphins on January 1, 2018.

On April 4, 2018, Doughty was waived by the Dolphins.

Arizona Cardinals
On April 5, 2018, Doughty was claimed off waivers by the Arizona Cardinals. He was waived on May 7, 2018.

See also
 List of college football yearly passing leaders
 List of Division I FBS passing touchdown leaders

References

External links
 WKU profile

Living people
1991 births
People from Davie, Florida
Players of American football from Florida
Sportspeople from Broward County, Florida
American football quarterbacks
Western Kentucky Hilltoppers football players
Miami Dolphins players
Arizona Cardinals players